Selected Letters IV (1932-1934) is a collection of letters by H. P. Lovecraft. It was released in 1976 by Arkham House in an edition of 4,978 copies.  It is the fourth of a five volume series of collections of Lovecraft's letters and includes a preface by James Turner.

Contents

Selected Letters IV (1932-1934) includes letters to:

 J. Vernon Shea
 Robert E. Howard
 Helen Sully
 E. Hoffmann Price

References

1976 non-fiction books
Arkham House books
Books published posthumously
Collections of letters
Non-fiction books by H. P. Lovecraft